Adolf Frey (4 April 1865 – 4 October 1938) was an American composer of German birth. Born in Landau, he was a pupil of Johannes Brahms, Immanuel Faiszt, and Clara Schumann. From 1887-1893 he was a musician to Prince Alexander Frederick of Hesse. He then moved to the United States, where he began teaching on the faculty of Syracuse University in the Fall of 1893.

References

External links
 

1865 births
1938 deaths
American male composers
American composers
Syracuse University faculty